William Henry Goold (15 December 1815 – 29 June 1897) was a Scottish minister of both the Reformed Presbyterian Church and the Free Church of Scotland. He was the last Moderator of the majority Reformed Presbyterian Church Synod before the union with the Free Church in 1876 when most of the R. P. congregations entered the union. He was also called to be Moderator of General Assembly of the Free Church in the following year: 1877.

Life

He was born on 15 December 1815 at 28 Buccleuch Place the only son of Rev William Goold. His father was a member of the Reformed Presbyterian Church. He was educated at the old High School and in 1829 was one of the pupils in the newly built High School on Calton Hill. He was school dux in his final year of 1831. He took a degree at the University of Edinburgh and then studied divinity at the Theological Hall in Paisley.

He was licensed to preach by the Reformed Church on 14 April 1840 and was subsequently ordained on 6 October as a colleague in his father's church in Edinburgh. The congregation of the Martyrs' Church met on George IV Bridge and Goold relocated to live, initially at Buccleuch Street and then, around 1850, at 28 Buccleuch Place.

In 1854 he was elected successor to Andrew Symington, his mentor and wife's uncle, at the Theological College in Paisley. From 1860 he was Secretary of the National Bible Society of Scotland. In 1876 the Reformed Presbyterian Church merged with the Free Church of Scotland, continuing simply as the Free Church of Scotland. William Goold was central to the conditions of the merge.

Dr Goold took a leading part in the movements for Union. He grieved that the larger projected Union of 1873 failed. What he did for the Union of 1876 was recognised by his being chosen the last Moderator of his own Church, and the Moderator of the General Assembly of the Free Church in 1877. He succeeded Thomas McLauchlan as Moderator of the General Assembly; he was the first from a Cameronian background to serve in this role. He was succeeded in 1878 by the Andrew Bonar.

In 1890 there was a celebration of his jubilee in the Martyrs Church.

He died at home 28 Mansionhouse Road in the Grange, Edinburgh on 29 June 1897 aged 81. He requested that Psalm 103 was read to him before he died.

The Martyrs Church transferred to the Free Church of Scotland in the Union of 1876. In the 20th century it became the Elim Pentecostal Church for Edinburgh. It is now in secular use as a public house.

Family
In 1846 he married Margaret Speirs Symington (d.1875) daughter of Rev William Symington of the Reformed Presbyterian Church in Stranraer. They had two daughters and four sons, one son died three weeks before his wife and another a few weeks after.

His sister Janet Helen Goold married George Smeaton.

He married 1846, Margaret Spiers (born 5 August 1822, died 25 October 1876) daughter of William Symington, R.P.C. Glasgow, and had issue -
Agnes Spiers, born 2 June 1847 died 6 October 1847
Isabella Burrell, born 3 June 1848, died unmarried, 22 January 1923
William Symington, born 19 December, 1849, died 14 June 1863
Andrew Symington, born 10 December 1852, died 30 December 1917
George Smeaton, born 30 May 1854, died 17 January 1940
Alexander Macleod Symington, born 22 May 1856, died 11 September 1875
Henry Burrell, born 8 June 1862, died 25 November 1875
Litellus Burrell, b. 8 Jun. 1862, died 8 August 1894
Margaret Spiers Symington, born 11 April 1860, died unmarried 19 November 1914

Publications
Claims of the Church of Christ
The Church: Its Privileges and Duties
The Consummation of Christ's Works

Patronage opposed to the Independence of the Church (Edinburgh 1841)
Popery and Puseyism (Glasgow 1847)
The Maynooth Endowment, a sin and a blunder (Edinburgh 1852)
On the Supernatural in Christianity (Edinburgh 1865)
Claims of the Church of Christ
Work of Christ's Church in Modern Times, etc.
He edited the Edinburgh edition of the Works of John Owen.

References

Citations

Sources

External links
 

1815 births
1897 deaths
19th-century Ministers of the Free Church of Scotland
Ministers of the Reformed Presbyterian Church of Scotland